Ervin Stone Yen is an American physician and politician who represented the 40th district in the Oklahoma Senate from 2014 to 2018.

Early life, education and career
Yen was born in Taipei in 1954. His parents moved to the United States in 1959 and settled in northwest Oklahoma City. Yen graduated from Putnam City High School in Warr Acres. Yen earned a Bachelor of Science degree in zoology from the University of Oklahoma and then a medical degree from the University of Oklahoma College of Medicine.

Career 
Outside of politics, Yen works as an anesthesiologist. He witnessed Oklahoma's October 28, 2021 execution of John Grant with a three drug protocol and testified as an expert for the state Attorney General's office, at a rate of $250 per hour, that the prisoner was fully unconscious when he was observed struggling to breathe, convulsing, and vomiting on the execution gurney.

Oklahoma Senate 
Yen ran for the district 40 state senate seat against Brian Winslow, Joe Howell, Steve Kern, David B. Hooten, and Michael Taylor in a Republican primary in 2014. He defeated pastor Steve Kern in a runoff. He defeated Democrat John Handy Edwards in the general election. Yen is the first Physician in the Oklahoma Senate in 40 years. He is also the first Asian American in the legislature in Oklahoma history.

Yen supports only medical exemptions to school vaccinations and introduced bills to that effect in the 2016 and 2017 legislative sessions.

Yen was instrumental in passing a bill outlawing texting while driving and authored a bill which became law that kept children from using commercial tanning beds.

Yen lost his 2018 primary election to veterinarian Joe Howell, whose campaign was largely financed by the Oklahomans for Vaccine and Health Choice, an anti-vaccination group.

In February 2019, Yen received the American Medical Association's Dr. Nathan Davis Award for Outstanding Government Service as a State Legislator.

2022 Oklahoma gubernatorial election 
Yen ran in the 2022 Oklahoma gubernatorial election. During his campaign, he left the Republican Party and registered as an independent, citing the rise of COVID-19 misinformation and the widespread belief that Trump won the 2020 election in the GOP as well as the party's rejection of temporary mask mandates and vaccine mandates. He placed fourth, receiving 1.36% of the vote.

Electoral history

References

External links

 Ervin Yen for Governor campaign website

1954 births
20th-century American physicians
21st-century American physicians
21st-century American politicians
American anesthesiologists
American politicians of Taiwanese descent
Asian American and Pacific Islander state legislators in Oklahoma
Candidates in the 2022 United States elections
Living people
Oklahoma Independents
People from Oklahoma County, Oklahoma
Politicians from Taipei
Physicians from Oklahoma
Republican Party Oklahoma state senators
Taiwanese emigrants to the United States
University of Oklahoma alumni